Calpocalyx is a genus of flowering plants in the family Fabaceae. 
It contains the following species:
 Calpocalyx atlanticus
 Calpocalyx aubrevillei
 Calpocalyx brevibracteatus
 Calpocalyx brevifolius
 Calpocalyx cauliflorus
 Calpocalyx dinklagei
 Calpocalyx heitzii
 Calpocalyx klainei—misise
 Calpocalyx letestui
 Calpocalyx ngouiensis
 Calpocalyx winkleri

References

Mimosoids
Fabaceae genera
Taxonomy articles created by Polbot